Synchronized swimming competitions at the 2016 Summer Olympics in Rio de Janeiro were staged from 15 to 20 August at the Maria Lenk Aquatic Center. A total of 104 athletes competed in two medal events, namely the women's duet and the women's team.

Qualification

For the team competitions, the best ranked NOC in each of the five continental championships, with the exception of the host country Brazil which represented the Pan American continent, obtained a secured place for the Games, while the remaining NOCs battled out for the three highest-ranked spots at the Olympic Qualification Tournament. For the duet, the best ranked NOC in each of the five continental championships that did not have a qualified team assured a secured spot, while the other eleven top-ranked NOCs were selected through Olympic Qualification Tournament. All eight NOCs that had already qualified in the team event must each automatically selected two synchronized swimmers to form a duet.

Participating nations

Competition Schedule

Medalists

Medal table

References

External links 

 
 
 Results Book – Synchronised Swimming

 
2016 Summer Olympics events
2012
2016 in synchronized swimming
Synchronized swimming competitions in Brazil
International aquatics competitions hosted by Brazil